A drifter is a vagrant who moves from place to place without a fixed home or employment.

Drifter(s) or The Drifter(s) may also refer to:

Films and television

Films
 The Drifter (1917 film), an American film directed by Fred Kelsey
 The Drifters (film), a 1919 American film starring J. Warren Kerrigan
 Drifters (1929 film), a British documentary by John Grierson
 The Drifter (1929 film), an American film starring Tom Mix
 The Drifter (1932 film), an American film directed by William A. O'Connor
 The Drifter (1944 film), an American Western Billy the Kid film directed by Sam Newfield
 The Drifter (1988 film), an American film starring Kim Delaney and Timothy Bottoms
 Drifters (2003 film), a Chinese film directed by Wang Xiaoshuai
 The Drifter (2010 film), a German film directed by Tatjana Turanskyj
 Drifters (2011 film), an Italian drama starring Asia Argento
 Drifters (2015 film), a Swedish film
 Drifter (film), a 2016 American post-apocalyptic thriller
 Drifter: Henry Lee Lucas, a 2009 horror film

Television
 Drifters (TV series), a British television series
 Drifter, an orange high-technology car in the TV series Roary the Racing Car

Literature
 The Drifters (novel), a 1971 novel by James A. Michener
 Drifter series (Drifter, Drifter’s Run, and Drifter’s War), by William C. Dietz
 Drifters (manga), a 2009 Japanese manga by Kouta Hirano

Maritime
 Drifter (fishing boat), a type of herring boat
 Naval drifter, a naval boat similar to the fishing boats

Music

Bands 
 Drifter, an alternate name of Dutch electronic music trio Noisia
 Drifters (Swedish band), a Swedish dans-band
 The Drifters, an American doo wop/R&B vocal group
 The Drifters (Japanese band), a rock band and comedy act
 The Shadows, a British group originally known as the Drifters
 The Drifters, an Irish band fronted by Joe Dolan

Albums 
 Drifters/Love Is The Devil, a 2013 album by Dirty Beaches
 The Drifter (Marty Robbins album), 1966
 Drifter (Sylvia album), 1981
 Drifter (Lynn Verlayne album), 2010

Songs 
 "Drifter" (song), a 1981 song by Sylvia, track song from the similarly titled album
 "Drifter", by Amy Lee featuring Dave Edgar from Lee's album Aftermath
 "Drifter", by Brookes Brothers from the single "Tear You Down"
 "Drifter", by David Gates from his album Goodbye Girl
 "Drifter", by Deep Purple from their album Come Taste the Band
 "Drifter", by Falling In Reverse from their album Fashionably Late
 "Drifter", by In Flames from their album Reroute to Remain
 "Drifter", by Iron Maiden from their album Killers
 "Drifter", by Karmin from their album Pulses
 "Drifters", by Patrick Watson from their album Close to Paradise
 "The Drifter", by Gene Clark and Carla Olson from their album So Rebellious a Lover
 "The Drifter", by Little River Band from their album After Hours

Other uses
 The Drifter, an animated web series produced by Stan Lee Media
 Kawasaki Vulcan 800 Drifter or Kawasaki Vulcan 1500 Drifter, motorcycles manufactured from 1999 to 2006
 Drifter (chocolate), a Nestlé chocolate bar in the UK
 Drifter (drill), a rock or ground drill
 Someone engaged in the motorsport drifting
 Lockwood Drifter, an ultralight aircraft

See also
 Drift (disambiguation)